The 1971–72 County Championship was the 30th season of the Liga IV, the fourth tier of the Romanian football league system. The champions of each county association play against one from a neighboring county in a play-off  to gain promotion to Divizia C.

Promotion play-off 
Teams promoted to Divizia C without a play-off matches as teams from less represented counties in the third division.

 (VN) Locomotiva Adjud
 (VS) Unirea Tricolor Bârlad
 (AG) Textilistul Pitești
 (DJ) Victoria Craiova

 (AR) Constructorul Arad
 (BH) Minerul Bihor
 (SJ) Rapid Jibou
 (BN) Foresta Susenii Bârgăului

The matches were played on 2 and 9 July 1972.

County leagues

Arad County

Brașov County

Galați County

Harghita County

Hunedoara County 
 Valea Jiului Series

 Valea Mureșului Series

Championship final 

Dacia Orăștie won the 1971–72 Hunedoara County Championship and qualify for promotion play-off in Divizia C.

Neamț County

Prahova County

Sibiu County

See also 

 1971–72 Divizia A
 1971–72 Divizia B
 1971–72 Divizia C

References

External links
 

Liga IV seasons
4
Romania